The freshwater seals are seals which live in freshwater bodies.

The only exclusively freshwater seal species is the Baikal seal, locally named .

The others are the subspecies or colonies of regular saltwater seals. These include two subspecies of ringed seal: the Ladoga seal and the Saimaa ringed seal.

Common seals  (harbor seals) are known to enter estuaries and freshwater rivers in pursuit of their prey. Colonies of common seals live in some lakes, such as seals of Iliamna Lake, Alaska, trapped there a long time ago. There is also a subspecies called the Ungava seal (Phoca vitulina mellonae) that comprises less than 300 individuals landlocked in the fresh water of Lacs des Loups Marins, Petit Lac de Loups Marins, and Lac Bourdel in northern Quebec.

California sea lions can also live in fresh water for periods of time, such as near Bonneville Dam, nearly  up the Columbia River. In 2004, a healthy sea lion was found sitting on a road in Merced County, California, almost a hundred miles upstream from the San Francisco Bay and half a mile from the San Joaquin River.

References

Pinnipeds
Freshwater animals